Singapore competed at the 2019 World Aquatics Championships in Gwangju, South Korea from 12 to 28 July.

Artistic swimming

Singapore's artistic swimming team consisted of 11 athletes (11 female).

Women

Diving

Singapore entered 7 divers (3 male and 4 female).

Men

Women

Swimming

Singapore entered twelve swimmers (7 men and 5 women).

Men

Women

Mixed

References

Nations at the 2019 World Aquatics Championships
Singapore at the World Aquatics Championships
2019 in Singaporean sport